Garrido may refer to:

Cayetana blanca, a wine grape also known as Garrido
Garrido (surname), a French and Spanish surname
Garrido's Hutia, a critically endangered species that is found in the Greater Antillean moist forests Global 200 ecoregion
Garrido (Mexico City Metrobús), a BRT station in Mexico City

See also
Garrido Fino, another wine grape
Garridos, a football club from Cape Verde